Leonardo Gula (born 6 March 1914, date of death unknown) was an Argentine boxer who competed in the 1936 Summer Olympics.

Gula was born in Cordoba, Argentina. In 1936 he was eliminated in the first round of the bantamweight class after losing his fight to Jack Wilson.

External links
Leonardo Gula's profile at Sports Reference.com
Leonardo Gula's profile at Boxrec.com
  

1914 births
Year of death missing
Bantamweight boxers
Olympic boxers of Argentina
Boxers at the 1936 Summer Olympics
Argentine male boxers